Chickasaw Female College was a women's college in Pontotoc, Mississippi.

It was founded in 1851 as the Pontotoc Female College, taken over by the Presbyterian church in 1853, and closed in 1936.  During the American Civil War the college was used as a hospital by both the Union Army and the Confederate States Army.

References

External links
stopping points entry

Educational institutions established in 1852
Defunct private universities and colleges in Mississippi
Educational institutions disestablished in 1936
Former women's universities and colleges in the United States
1852 establishments in Mississippi
1936 disestablishments in Mississippi
History of women in Mississippi
Pontotoc County, Mississippi